Walter Bauer (8 August 1877 – 17 November 1960) was a German theologian, lexicographer of New Testament Greek, and scholar of the development of Early Christianity.

Life

Bauer was born in Königsberg, East Prussia, and raised in Marburg,  where his father was a professor. He studied theology at the universities of Marburg, Strassburg, and Berlin. Bauer taught at Breslau and Göttingen, where he later died.

Work
Bauer's most famous and influential work is his 1934 book  (Tübingen; a second edition in 1964, edited by Georg Strecker, was translated as Orthodoxy and Heresy in Earliest Christianity in a 1971 English edition). In it, Bauer developed his thesis that in earliest Christianity, orthodoxy and heresy do not stand in relation to one another as primary to secondary. In many regions, beliefs that would be considered "heresy" centuries later were the original and accepted form of Christianity. Bauer pushed against the overwhelmingly dominant view that for the period of Christian origins, ecclesiastical doctrine already represented what is primary, while heresies, on the other hand somehow are a deviation from the genuine. This was the view from the major Church historians of the era such as Eusebius, whose book Church History portrayed orthodox Christianity as descending from Jesus's clear teachings, and heresies as unusual offshoots by people who are evil, misled by the devil, and so on.

Through studies of historical records, Bauer concluded that what came to be known as orthodoxy was just one of numerous forms of Christianity in the early centuries. It was the eventual form of Christianity practiced in the 4th century that influenced the development of orthodoxy and acquired the majority of converts over time. This was largely due to the conversion to Christianity of the Roman Emperor Constantine I and consequently the greater resources available to the Christians in the eastern Roman empire capital he established (Constantinople). Practitioners of what became orthodoxy then rewrote the history of the conflict making it appear that this view had always been the majority one. Writings in support of other views were systematically destroyed.

Bauer's conclusions contradicted nearly 1,600 years of writing on church history and thus were met with much skepticism among Christian academics such as Walther Völker.

The cultural isolation of Nazi Germany precluded a wider dissemination of Bauer's ideas until after World War II; in the international field of biblical scholarship, Bauer continued to be known solely as the compiler of the monumental  (in its English translation A Greek-English Lexicon of the New Testament and Other Early Christian Literature or the Bauer Lexicon), which has become standard.  was finally translated into English in 1970 and published in 1971. Since then, Bauer's view has gained prominence and grudging acceptance; events since the original 1934 publication date, such as the discovery of the Nag Hammadi library in 1945, have generally supported Bauer's thesis by showing a much broader and diverse range of Christianities than the classical view would have expected.

Reception
Bauer's translator, Robert A. Kraft, praised his sophisticated, nuanced writing style, which:

An early critic of the Bauer thesis, Anglican theologian H. E. W. Turner in his Bampton Lectures, delivered at Oxford in 1954, said of Bauer, "His fatal weakness appears to be a persistent tendency to over-simplify problems, combined with the ruthless treatment of such evidence as fails to support his case. [...] Perhaps the root difficulty is that Bauer fails to attain an adequate view of the nature of orthodoxy. [...] For the nature of orthodoxy is richer and more varied than Bauer himself allows."

A later book critiquing Bauer's thesis and the subsequent work Bart Erhman did espousing and expanding Bauer's thesis is The Heresy of Orthodoxy by Andreas J. Kostenberger and Michael Kruger, published in 2010, which addresses the thesis on the basis of historical, philosophical and theological argument.

See also
 Christian heresy
 F. Wilbur Gingrich
 Bauer's Lexicon
 Proto-orthodox Christianity

Notes

References
 Walter, Bauer (2000). Danker, Frederick W. (ed.). A Greek-English lexicon of the New Testament and other early Christian literature (Third ed.). Chicago. . Retrieved 16 December 2021.
 Walter Bauer, 1971. Orthodoxy and Heresy in Earliest Christianity (Philadelphia: Fortress)  (on-line: Updated Electronic English Edition by Robert A. Kraft, 1993).
 Bart D Ehrman, 2002. Lost Christianities: Christian Scriptures and the Battles over Authentication (Chantilly VA: The Teaching Company), Lesson 19, pg 28.

Early criticism

 David L Hawkin, "Thirty Years Later: a retrospective on the significance of H. E. W. Turner's The Pattern of Christian Truth," in Churchman 99.1 (1985): 51-56.
 Walther Völker, "Walter Bauer's Rechtgläubigkeit und Ketzerei im ältesten Christentum", translated by Thomas P. Scheck in Journal of Early Christian Studies 14.4 (2006): 399-405.  Originally published in Zeitschrift für Kirchengeschichte 54 (1935): 628–31.

1877 births
1960 deaths
Scholars of Koine Greek
German biblical scholars
German Lutheran theologians
Writers from Königsberg
People from the Province of Prussia
University of Marburg alumni
University of Strasbourg alumni
Humboldt University of Berlin alumni
Academic staff of the University of Breslau
Academic staff of the University of Göttingen
20th-century German Protestant theologians
German male non-fiction writers
Lutheran biblical scholars
Members of the Göttingen Academy of Sciences and Humanities